Thomas Jones Enright (August 15, 1947 – January 27, 2019) was an American mathematician known for his work in the algebraic theory of representations of real reductive Lie groups.

Biography
Enright received a B.S. from Harvard University in 1969 and a Ph.D. in 1973 from the University of Washington under the direction of Ramesh A. Gangolli. From 1973 to 1975 he was the Hedrick Assistant Professor in UCLA working with Veeravalli S. Varadarajan, and spent the 1976-1977 year after in the Institute for Advanced Study at Princeton, N. J.  before starting at University of California at San Diego in 1977. He was chair of the mathematics department of  UCSD from 1986 to 1990. In 2010 he retired due symptoms of Parkinson's disease.

Contributions
In the mid-1970s, Enright introduced new methods that led him to an algebraic way of looking at discrete series (which were fundamental representations constructed by Harish-Chandra in the early 1960s), and to an algebraic proof of the Blattner multiplicity formula.

He was known for Enright–Varadarajan modules, Enright resolutions, and the Enright completion functor, which has had a lasting influence in algebra.

Recognition 
 Recipient of Alfred P. Sloan Fellowship, 1978
 Enright's work was the subject of a Bourbaki Seminar by Michel Duflo

Bibliography 
 
 
 
 Enright, Thomas; Howe, Roger; Wallach, Nolan (1983-01-01). Trombi, P. C., ed. A Classification of Unitary Highest Weight Modules. Progress in Mathematics. Birkhäuser Boston. pp. 97–143. doi:10.1007/978-1-4684-6730-7_7. .
 
 
 Enright, Thomas J.; Hunziker, Markus; Pruett, W. Andrew (2014-01-01). Howe, Roger; Hunziker, Markus; Willenbring, Jeb F., eds. Diagrams of Hermitian type, highest weight modules, and syzygies of determinantal varieties. Progress in Mathematics. Springer New York. pp. 121–184. doi:10.1007/978-1-4939-1590-3_6. .

References

External links

Homepage of Thomas Jones Enright
Thomas Jones Enright's obituary

1947 births
2019 deaths
20th-century American mathematicians
21st-century American mathematicians
University of California, San Diego faculty
Harvard University alumni
University of Washington alumni